"On the Ning Nang Nong" is a poem by the comedian Spike Milligan featured in his 1959 book Silly Verse For Kids. In 1998 it was voted the UK's favourite comic poem in a nationwide poll, ahead of other nonsense poems by poets such as Lewis Carroll and Edward Lear.

This nonsense verse, set to music, became popular in Australia where it was performed weekly on the ABC children's programme Play School; however, it is now only shown on occasion. In December 2007 it was reported that, according to OFSTED, it is among the ten most commonly taught poems in primary schools in the UK.

It features on the albums No One's Gonna Change Our World, There's A Bear In There and Play School Favourites, and on the 'B' side of Milligan's own "Badjelly the Witch".

Poem

The 18-line poem opens with: 
On the Ning Nang Nong
Where the cows go bong!

Several subsequent lines also use the phrase "Nong Nang Ning" or "Nong Ning Nang" (but never "Ning Nong Nang", "Nang Ning Nong" or "Nang Nong Ning"). The poem ends with the climax "Ning Nang Ning Nang Nong!"

Various animals, plants and created objects "say" or, more often, "go" various sounds (capitalization in the original): cows go "Bong!", monkeys say "Boo!", trees go "Ping!", tea pots "Jibber-Jabber Joo", mice go "Clang!". Some do this more than once in the poem.

The poem's rhyme scheme is AABCCBDDBAACCDDAA.

A musical version appears in the 1975 British sex farce Confessions of a Pop Performer.

References

Humorous poems
British poems
Works by Spike Milligan